Observance may refer to:

 Holiday, day(s) of observance
 Anniversary, the date on which an event took place or an institution was founded in a previous year, and may also refer to the commemoration or celebration of that event
 List of minor secular observances
 United States observances

See also 
 Observant (disambiguation)
 Observer (disambiguation)